Zundeliomyces is a monotypic genus of fungi found in the family Microbotryaceae. It contains the single species Zundeliomyces polygoni.

References

External links

Monotypic Basidiomycota genera
Microbotryales